Stylopathidae is a family of corals belonging to the order Antipatharia.

Genera:
 Stylopathes Opresko, 2006
 Triadopathes Opresko, 2006
 Tylopathes Brook, 1889

References

Antipatharia
Cnidarian families